The People's Enemy is a 1935 American crime film directed by Crane Wilbur, from a screenplay by Gordon Kahn and Edward Dean Sullivan, based on Sullivan's story.  The film stars Preston Foster, Melvyn Douglas, and Charles Coburn.

References

External links

1935 films
Films directed by Crane Wilbur
American black-and-white films
American crime drama films
1935 crime drama films
1930s American films